John Francis Carmody (28 June 1938 – 25 May 1985) was an Australian rules footballer who played with Collingwood and Fitzroy in the Victorian Football League (VFL).

Carmody, the son of Collingwood premiership player Jack Carmody, was a rover, half forward and wingman. He was recruited from Alphington YCW

He made 11 appearances in his first season, including a semi final, but was called up just five times in 1960 and crossed to Fitzroy.

Carmody captain-coached Greensborough to back to back Diamond Valley Football League premierships in 1966 and 1967.

References

1938 births
Australian rules footballers from Melbourne
Collingwood Football Club players
Fitzroy Football Club players
Greensborough Football Club players
Greensborough Football Club coaches
1985 deaths